Happy hardcore  is a genre of hard dance music emerging around 1991–1993.

Happy hardcore may also refer to:
 Our Happy Hardcore, an album by German dance group Scooter.
 Bouncy techno, a hardcore dance music rave style that developed in the early 1990s, known as happy hardcore in the Netherlands
 Easycore, a genre fusing pop punk  with elements of hardcore punk subgenres.